"Hello, You Beautiful Thing" is a pop song by American singer-songwriter Jason Mraz. It was released on May 23, 2014 on Atlantic Records as the first promotional single from his fifth studio album Yes!.

Music video 
The music video was released on July 15, 2014. The music video was directed by Jeff Nicholas and Jonathan Craven

Track listing 
CD Single
Hello, You Beautiful Thing — 3:32

Download digital
Hello, You Beautiful Thing — 3:32

Charts

Release history

References

2014 songs
Atlantic Records singles
Jason Mraz songs
Song recordings produced by Jason Mraz
Songs written by Jason Mraz